UU or uu may refer to:

Businesses
 United Utilities (LSE stock symbol UU)
 Air Austral (IATA airline code UU)

Language
 "uu", an old way of spelling the letter "w" in certain Germanic languages, including Old English
 The letter combination of uu

Science and technology
 UUNET, Internet Service Provider commonly referred to as 'UU'
 Unique users, may be counted as part of web analytics in determining the popularity of a website
 UMTS air interface or "Uu interface", which links User Equipment to the UMTS Terrestrial Radio Access Network
 Unix-to-Unix, as in uuencode, a data transport encoding
 .uu, a compressed archive file extension, associated with uuencode

Universities
 Ulster University in Northern Ireland
 University of Utah in Salt Lake City, Utah, United States
 Uppsala University in Sweden
 Utrecht University in the Netherlands
 Uttaranchal University in  Uttarakhand, India

Other uses
Union of Utrecht (Old Catholic), a federation of Old Catholic churches
Unitarian Universalism, a theologically liberal religion characterized by its support for a "free and responsible search for truth and meaning."
 Unseen University, in the fictional Discworld novels of Terry Pratchett

UU, the production code for the 1968 Doctor Who serial The Mind Robber
U'u a war club from Marquesas Islands
Undead Unluck a shorthand for the manga by Yoshifumi Tozuka.

See also

 
 
 VV (disambiguation)
 W (disambiguation)
 2U (disambiguation)
 U2 (disambiguation)